The Snake is the first solo album by Shane MacGowan with backing band The Popes.  Released in 1994 by ZTT Records.  Guests on the album include Johnny Depp and members of The Dubliners, Thin Lizzy and The Pogues.

An expanded edition was released in 1995 with a revised running order and added three additional tracks: the traditional songs "Nancy Whiskey" and "Roddy McCorley", which had been released as b-sides the previous year, as well as a duet with Sinéad O'Connor - a new recoding of the Pogues song "Haunted". The song would later also appear on the soundtrack for the romantic comedy film Two If by Sea.

A third edition, first released on vinyl in 1995, adds another duet, "You're the One", this time with Clannad's Máire Brennan, from the soundtrack to the film Circle of Friends.

A fourth, further-expanded release appeared as a limited edition CD remaster in Japan only in 2009, adding the 1997 b-side "A Man Called Horse" as a bonus track.

Like a number of songs recorded by MacGowan's previous band, The Pogues, traditional tunes are sometimes used as a base for a new song (for example, the melody for "The Song With No Name" is based on "The Homes of Donegal").

Track listings

All songs composed by Shane MacGowan; except where noted

Original Edition

Released by ZTT in 1994 on CD and cassette in 1994 in Europe, Canada, Australia and Japan, and on vinyl in Europe only. Re-released on vinyl in Europe in 2016 by Music On Vinyl/WEA.

 "The Church Of The Holy Spook"
 "That Woman's Got Me Drinking"
 "The Song with No Name"
 "Aisling"
 "I'll Be Your Handbag"
 "Her Father Didn't Like Me Anyway" (Gerry Rafferty)
 "A Mexican Funeral In Paris"
 "The Snake with Eyes of Garnet"
 "Donegal Express"
 "Victoria"
 "The Rising of the Moon" (Traditional, arranged S. MacGowan)
 "Bring Down the Lamp"

First Expanded Release

Released in 1995 on CD and cassette in the US by Warner Bros. Records/ZTT, in Europe by ZTT, and in Poland by Warner Music Poland

 "The Church Of The Holy Spook"
 "Nancy Whiskey" (Traditional)
 "The Song with No Name"
 "Aisling"
 "Roddy McCorley" (Traditional)
 "Victoria"
 "That Woman's Got Me Drinking"
 "A Mexican Funeral In Paris"
 "The Rising of the Moon" (Traditional, arranged S. MacGowan)
 "The Snake with Eyes of Garnet"
 "Haunted"
 "I'll Be Your Handbag"
 "Her Father Didn't Like Me Anyway" (Gerry Rafferty)
 "Bring Down the Lamp"
 "Donegal Express"

Second Expanded Release
Released by ZTT in 1995 on vinyl in France & Germany only, and on CD in Europe in 1998
 "The Church Of The Holy Spook"
 "Nancy Whiskey" (Traditional)
 "The Song with No Name"
 "Aisling"
 "Roddy McCorley" (Traditional)
 "Victoria"
 "That Woman's Got Me Drinking"
 "You're the One" (Shane MacGowan, Michael Kamen)
 "A Mexican Funeral In Paris"
 "The Rising of the Moon" (Traditional; arranged by Shane MacGowan)
 "The Snake with Eyes of Garnet"
 "Haunted"
 "I'll Be Your Handbag"
 "Her Father Didn't Like Me Anyway" (Gerry Rafferty)
 "Bring Down the Lamp"
 "Donegal Express"

Third Expanded Release
Released by ZTT in 2009 as a limited edition remastered CD in Japan only.
 "The Church Of The Holy Spook"
 "Nancy Whiskey" (Traditional)
 "The Song with No Name"
 "Aisling"
 "Roddy McCorley" (Traditional)
 "Victoria"
 "That Woman's Got Me Drinking"
 "You're the One" (Shane MacGowan, Michael Kamen)
 "A Mexican Funeral In Paris"
 "The Rising of the Moon" (Traditional; arranged by Shane MacGowan)
 "The Snake with Eyes of Garnet"
 "Haunted"
 "I'll Be Your Handbag"
 "Her Father Didn't Like Me Anyway" (Gerry Rafferty)
 "Bring Down the Lamp"
 "Donegal Express"
 "A Man Called Horse' [Bonus Track]

Personnel
The Popes
Paul McGuinness - guitar, vocals
Bernie "The Undertaker" France - bass, vocals
Danny Pope - drums, percussion
Tom "The Beast" McManamon, aka "Tom McAnimal" - tenor banjo 
Kieran "Mo" O'Hagan - guitar, vocals 
Colm O'Maonlai - whistles
with:
Barney McKenna - tenor banjo
John Sheahan - fiddle, whistle
Brian Robertson - guitar
Siobhan Sheahan - Irish harp
Spider Stacy - whistle
Jem Finer - 5-string banjo
Tomas Lynch - uillean pipes
Rick Trevan - tenor saxophone
Dick Cuthell - trumpet
Sarah Jane Tuff - alto saxophone
Paul Taylor - trombone
Johnny Depp - "guitar weird noises" ("That Woman's Got Me Drinking")
Máire Brennan - vocals on "You're The One"
Sinéad O'Connor - vocals on "Haunted"
Ron Kavana - guitar on "Haunted" (uncredited)

Technical
Produced by Dave Jordan and Shane MacGowan
Mixed by Steve Brown
Engineered by Niall Flynn, Steve Musters, Darren Westbrook and Richard Rainy
Recorded at Sarm East, Windmill Lane, Marcus, Raezor.
Mixed at Raezor.

References

1994 debut albums
Shane MacGowan and The Popes albums
ZTT Records albums